is a Japanese freestyle BMX rider.

In 2019, he won a 2nd Place: X Games Minneapolis – BMX Park. The same year, he won the overall fise 2019 UCI BMX Freestyle Park World Cup. 

He has qualified to represent Japan at the 2020 Summer Olympics and he finished 5th.

He is the world champion of freestyle park of the 2022 UCI Urban Cycling World Championships.

See also
UCI Urban Cycling World Championships
Rim (wheel)

References

Living people
2002 births
BMX riders
Japanese male cyclists
Sportspeople from Kyoto
Olympic cyclists of Japan
Cyclists at the 2020 Summer Olympics
X Games athletes
21st-century Japanese people